The Furuta pendulum, or rotational inverted pendulum, consists of a driven arm which rotates in the horizontal plane and a pendulum attached to that arm which is free to rotate in the vertical plane.  It was invented in 1992 at Tokyo Institute of Technology by Katsuhisa Furuta and his colleagues.  It is an example of a complex nonlinear oscillator of interest in control system theory.  The pendulum is underactuated and extremely non-linear due to the gravitational forces and the coupling arising from the Coriolis and centripetal forces.  Since then, dozens, possibly hundreds of papers and theses have used the system to demonstrate linear and non-linear control laws.  The system has also been the subject of two texts.

Equations of motion
Despite the great deal of attention the system has received, very few publications successfully derive (or use) the full dynamics.  Many authors have only considered the rotational inertia of the pendulum for a single principal axis (or neglected it altogether).  In other words, the inertia tensor only has a single non-zero element (or none), and the remaining two diagonal terms are zero. It is possible to find a pendulum system where the moment of inertia in one of the three principal axes is approximately zero, but not two.

A few authors have considered slender symmetric pendulums where the moments of inertia for two of the principal axes are equal and the remaining moment of inertia is zero.  Of the dozens of publications surveyed for this wiki only a single conference paper and journal paper were found to include all three principal inertial terms of the pendulum.  Both papers used a Lagrangian formulation but each contained minor errors (presumably typographical).

The equations of motion presented here are an extract from a paper on the Furuta pendulum dynamics derived at the University of Adelaide.

Definitions

Consider the rotational inverted pendulum mounted to a DC motor as shown in Fig. 1. The DC motor is used to apply a torque  to Arm 1. The link between Arm 1 and Arm 2 is not actuated but free to rotate.

A right hand coordinate system has been used to define the inputs, states and the Cartesian coordinate systems 1 and 2.  The coordinate axes of Arm 1 and Arm 2 are the principal axes such that the inertia tensors are diagonal.

The angular rotation of Arm 1, is measured in the horizontal plane where a counter-clockwise direction (when viewed from above) is positive.  The angular rotation of Arm 2, is measured in the vertical plane where a counter-clockwise direction (when viewed from the front) is positive.  When the Arm is hanging down in the stable equilibrium position  .

The torque the servo-motor applies to Arm 1, is positive in a counter-clockwise direction (when viewed from above).  A disturbance torque, is experienced by Arm 2, where a counter-clockwise direction (when viewed from the front) is positive.

Assumptions
Before deriving the dynamics of the system a number of assumptions must be made.  These are:
The motor shaft and Arm 1 are assumed to be rigidly coupled and infinitely stiff.
Arm 2 is assumed to be infinitely stiff.
The coordinate axes of Arm1 and Arm 2 are the principal axes such that the inertia tensors are diagonal.
The motor rotor inertia is assumed to be negligible.  However, this term may be easily added to the moment of inertia of Arm 1.
Only viscous damping is considered.  All other forms of damping (such as Coulomb) have been neglected, however it is a simple exercise to add this to the final governing DE.

Non-linear Equations of Motion
The non-linear equations of motion are given by

and

Simplifications
Most Furuta pendulums tend to have long slender arms, such that the moment of
inertia along the axis of the arms is negligible. In addition, most arms have
rotational symmetry such that the moments of inertia in two of the principal axes
are equal. Thus, the inertia tensors may be approximated as follows:

Further simplifications are obtained by making the following substitutions. The
total moment of inertia of Arm 1 about the pivot point (using the parallel axis theorem) 
The total moment of inertia of Arm 2 about its pivot
Finally, define the total moment of inertia the motor
rotor experiences when the pendulum (Arm 2) is in its equilibrium position
(hanging vertically down), .

Substituting the previous definitions into the governing DEs gives the more
compact form

and

See also
Inverted pendulum
Double inverted pendulum
Inertia wheel pendulum
Self-balancing unicycle

References

Further reading 
 On the Dynamics of the Furuta Pendulum
 Furuta's Pendulum: A Conservative Nonlinear Model for Theory and Practise
 Dynamic Analysis of the Tilted Furuta Pendulum

External links
 The University of Adelaide 
 University of Toronto
 Ohio State University 
 Example Rotary Inverted Pendulum

Pendulums
Control engineering